Bankouale is a town in Tadjoura region of Djibouti. One of the distinctive features of Bankouale countryside is the widespread growing of vegetables. In the meantime there are also first approaches to establish gentle tourism.

Climate
Bankouale has a hot arid climate (BWh) by the Köppen-Geiger system.

References

External links
Satellite map at Maplandia.com

Populated places in Djibouti
Tadjourah Region